The 2022–23 Jackson State Tigers basketball team represented Jackson State University in the 2022–23 NCAA Division I men's basketball season. The Tigers, led by first-year head coach Mo Williams, played their home games at the Williams Assembly Center in Jackson, Mississippi, as members of the Southwestern Athletic Conference.

Previous season
The Tigers finished the 2021–22 season 11–19, 9–9 in SWAC play to finish tied for sixth place. As the No. 7 seed, they were defeated by No. 2 seed Texas Southern in the quarterfinals of the SWAC tournament.

On March 4, head coach Wayne Brent announced that he'd retire following the 2021–22 season, ending his nine-year tenure with the team. On March 14, former NBA player and former Alabama State head coach Mo Williams was announced as the team's next head coach.

Roster

Schedule and results

|-
!colspan=12 style=| Exhibition

|-
!colspan=12 style=| Non-conference regular season

|-
!colspan=9 style=| SWAC regular season

|-
!colspan=9 style=| SWAC tournament

Sources

References

Jackson State Tigers basketball seasons
Jackson State Tigers
Jackson State Tigers basketball
Jackson State Tigers basketball